This is a list of the 75 largest public companies in Canada by profit as of 2012.

See also
 List of largest companies in Canada
 List of companies of Canada
 List of smallest companies in Canada

Footnotes

References

Lists of companies of Canada
Publicly traded companies of Canada